Tonmeister is most often found as a job description in the music and recording industries. It describes a person who is a sound master (a literal translation of the German word): a person who creates recordings or broadcasts of music who is both deeply musically trained (in 'classical' and non-classical genres) and also who has a detailed theoretical and practical knowledge of virtually all aspects of sound recording, music mixing and mastering. Both competencies have equal importance in a tonmeister's work.

A Tonmeister spans both art and technology: Working with musicians on a musical level to help them achieve the best Performance's and interpretation; and utilizing or directing the use of appropriate technology to produce the most communicative experience for the listener, including appropriate editing, sound balance and other post-production skills. One may say that a Tonmeister would utilize the techniques of scientific measurement (microphones, digital recorders, accurate amplifiers, etc.), but he or she is in the entertainment industry, too, using additional techniques to create experiences and illusions for performers and listeners.

The word tonmeister was trademarked in 1996 for the UK by the University of Surrey. Also within the UK, the SAE Institute registered the term SAE Tonmeister, which has been abbreviated to tonmeister in their registrations in several other countries, but not including Germany, Switzerland, or Austria. Members of the VDT may call themselves Tonmeister VDT.

When describing the full four-year UK BMus degree or its equivalent in Germany, the term is applied mostly to people who have graduated at bachelor's level in music and applied physics and who have gathered, under university supervision, at least a year of appropriate industrial experience in the music or recording business. Their musical training generally encompasses a full conventional classical training including instrumental studies, conducting, composition, historic and analytical studies and performance; together with applied physics and mathematics including calculus, the Fourier transform, complex numbers, information theory and modulation techniques, acoustics, electronics and much experience in recording techniques and music technology garnered in modern studios and on many locations. A portfolio of recordings must be offered in the final degree assessment.

Origins 

The concept of a Tonmeister dates back to 1946, when Arnold Schoenberg wrote a letter to the Chancellor of the University of Chicago suggesting a course to train "soundmen". Schoenberg wrote "soundmen will be trained in music, acoustics, physics, mechanics and related fields to a degree enabling them to control and improve the sonority of recordings, radio broadcasts and sound films". It was also in this year that the University in Detmold, Germany, started the first Tonmeister course (see below).

Education 
Many institutions offer honors degrees that are called Tonmeister: The Royal Danish Academy of Music Copenhagen (RDAM), the Warsaw Academy of Music, the Universität der Künste Berlin (UdK) and the Hochschule für Musik Detmold in Germany; the Universität für Musik und darstellende Kunst Wien in Austria, the Conservatoire de Paris, the University of Surrey in the United Kingdom; and (as a post-graduate study) the SAE Institute in Oxford, UK and Byron Bay, Australia.

In 1998, the previous Course Director at the University of Surrey, Dave Fisher, characterised the Tonmeister course as a course for excellent musicians/scientists who wish to acquire the theoretical knowledge and practical skills of sound recording along with both an academic understanding of audio engineering and also an experiential understanding of the technology of the sound recording and broadcast industries. Its aims were described in this way:
 a comprehensive and up-to-date knowledge base;
 intellectual and practical skills;
 technical, artistic and scholarly curiosity;
 motivation and self-directed learning skills;
 professional skills and training;
 communication and presentation skills;
 self-confidence;

...all acquired as appropriate for a career in audio engineering or sound recording.

Tonmeister Institute in Denmark 
The Royal Danish Academy of Music

Tonmeister Institutes in UK 
Surrey Tonmeister Course

Tonmeister Institutes in Germany 
Information zum Studiengang Tonmeister an der Universität der Künste Berlin
Universität der Künste Berlin
Information zum Studiengang Tonmeister am Erich-Thienhaus-Institut (ETI) der Hochschule für Musik Detmold
Information zum Studiengang Ton an der Hochschule für Film und Fernsehen (HFF) 'Konrad Wolf' Potsdam-Babelsberg

Tonmeister Institute in Switzerland 
Information zum Studiengang Tonmeister an der Zürcher Hochschule der Künste

Tonmeister Institute in Austria 
Information zur Studienrichtung Tonmeister an der Universität für Musik und darstellende Kunst Wien

Tonmeister Institute in the Netherlands 
Information zum Studiengang "Art of Sound", former "muziekregistratie" at the Royal Consevatoire, Den Haag, The Netherlands

Tonmeister Institute in Canada 
"The McGill Graduate Program in Sound Recording is the only program in North America to offer both a Master's and PhD degree. It follows the European Tonmeister tradition of training musicians to become sound engineers"

Tonmeister Institute in the United States 
"New York University offers a Masters in Music Technology with an advanced certificate in Tonmeister Studies"

Tonmeister Institute in France 
"The Conservatoire National Supérieur de Musique offers a 4-Year Masters in Sound recording, production and music theory"

Tonmeister Institute in Spain 
Escola Superior de música de Catalunya (ESMUC) offers a global view of all branches of the Sonology (recording, tonmeister, sound design, etc)
Real Conservatorio Superior de Música de Madrid offers a Degree in Sonology (recording, tonmeister, sound design, etc) since 2019
Conservatorio Superior de Música Joaquín Rodrigo de Valencia

Tonmeister Information 
German-language Wikipedia entry
Wikipedia entry
Verband Deutscher Tonmeister - VDT

References 

Music production
Audio engineering